Giru may refer to:
Giru, Queensland, in Australia
Giru (Dragon Ball GT), a character from the Dragon Ball GT series
Giru of Baekje, third king of Baekje
Giru Qowl, a village in Bamyan Province, Afghanistan
Giru, Iran, a village in East Azerbaijan Province, Iran

See also 
 Jiru (disambiguation)